Geng is the Mandarin pinyin romanization of the Chinese surname written  in Chinese character. It is romanized as Keng in Wade–Giles. Geng is listed 350th in the Song dynasty classic text Hundred Family Surnames. As of 2008, it is the 139th most common surname in China, shared by 990,000 people.

Notable people
Geng Chun (耿纯; died 37 AD), Eastern Han dynasty general, one of the Yuntai 28 generals
Geng Yan (3–58), another of the Yuntai 28 generals
Geng Guo (耿國; died 58), Eastern Han general, brother of Geng Yan
Geng Bing (耿秉; died 91), Eastern Han general, son of Geng Guo
Geng Shu (耿舒; 1st century), Eastern Han general
Geng Gong (耿恭), Eastern Han general, nephew of Geng Yan
Jian Yong (3rd century), original surname Geng, advisor of Liu Bei
Geng Quanbin (耿全斌; 10th century), Northern Song dynasty general
Geng Shuyi (耿淑仪; 983–1064), consort of Emperor Shengzong of Liao
Geng Jing (耿京; died 1162), Jin dynasty rebel leader
Geng Zaicheng (耿再成; died 1362), rebel leader under Zhu Yuanzhang, Duke of Si
Geng Bingwen (1334–1403), Ming dynasty general, Marquis of Changxing
Geng Xuan (耿璿), son of Geng Bingwen, executed by the Yongle Emperor
Geng Jiuchou (耿九畴; died 1460), Ming dynasty Minister of Justice
Geng Yu (耿裕; 1430–1496), Ming dynasty Minister of Rites, son of Geng Jiuchou
Geng Dingxiang (耿定向; 1524–1597), Ming dynasty Minister of Revenue
Geng Dingli (耿定力; 1541–?), Vice Minister of War, brother of Geng Dingxiang
Geng Zhongming (1604–1649), King/Prince of Jingnan of the Qing dynasty
Geng Jimao (died 1671), King/Prince of Jingnan, son of Geng Zhongming
Geng Jingzhong (died 1682), King/Prince of Jingnan, son of Geng Jimao, executed after rebelling against the Qing
Geng Juzhong (Chinese: 耿聚忠; 1650 – 1687) was the third son of Geng Jimao, brother of Revolt of the Three Feudatories participant Geng Jingzhong and court member of the Qing dynasty. He was a Third Class Viscount (三等子)
Geng Bozhao (耿伯钊; 1883–1957), Republic of China revolutionary and politician
Keng Yi-Li (1897–1975), Chinese botanist
Geng Jizhi (耿济之; 1899–1947), Republic of China diplomat and translator
Geng Biao (1909–2000), PRC Defense Minister and Vice Premier
Geng Quanli (耿全礼; born 1937), People's Liberation Army major general
Geng Lianfeng (耿莲凤; born 1944), singer
Geng Huichang (born 1951), Minister of State Security
Geng Yanbo (born 1958), former Mayor of Datong and Taiyuan
Geng Lijuan (born 1963), Chinese-Canadian female table tennis player, four-time world champion
Geng Le (耿乐; born 1974), actor
Keng Po-hsuan (born 1984), Taiwanese baseball player
Geng Xiaoling (耿曉靈; born 1984), Hong Kong female wushu athlete
Geng Xiaofeng (born 1987), football player
Geng Wenqiang (born 1995), skeleton racer
 Geng Shuai (born 1987 Chinese: 耿帥), dubbed the China's Useless Edison, Chinese village craftsman whose fame has grown online because of his odd and often unnecessary inventions

References

Chinese-language surnames
Individual Chinese surnames